Hoglabunia Union is an Union Parishad under Morrelganj Upazila of Bagerhat District in the division of Khulna, Bangladesh. It has an area of 82.23 km2 (31.75 sq mi) and a population of 23,030.

References

Unions of Morrelganj Upazila
Unions of Bagerhat District
Unions of Khulna Division